Central Bus Station can refer to:

 Cardiff Central bus station
 Haifa Bat Galim Central Bus Station
 Haifa Hof HaCarmel Central Bus Station
 HaMifratz Central Bus Station
 Jerusalem Central Bus Station
 Kiryat Malakhi Central Bus Station
 Montreal Central Bus Station
 Ottawa Central Bus Station
 Petah Tikva Central Bus Station
 Central Bus Station Sofia
 Tel Aviv Central Bus Station
 Central Bus Station, Tiruchirappalli
 Central Bus Station Thiruvananthapuram
 Carmel Beach Central Bus Station
 Kyiv Central Bus Station
 Hamburg Central Bus Station
 Bratislava Central Bus Station
 Zentraler Omnibusbahnhof München